Drömmen om julen was released on 28 October 2016 and is a Christmas album by Carola Häggkvist. The album release was followed up with a Christmas tour throughout Sweden and Norway.

One of the concerts, the one inside the Filadelfia Church in Stockholm on 1 December 2016, was broadcast over P4 Live on 23 December the same year.

Track listing

Contributing musicians
Carola Häggkvist – vocals
Peter Nordahl – piano, celesta, arranger, producer
Mikael Wenhov – violin
Johanna Tafvelin – violin
Magnus Ivarsson – violin
Sonja Vrieze – violin
Gunnar Enbom – viola
Crista Bergendahl – viola
Jan Duda – double bass
HC Green – percussion

Charts

Weekly charts

Year-end charts

References

External links

2016 Christmas albums
Carola Häggkvist albums
Christmas albums by Swedish artists